Lowell Peak is a  mountain summit located in the Kenai Mountains, on the Kenai Peninsula, in the U.S. state of Alaska. The months May and June offer the most favorable weather for viewing the mountain. In fair weather, the Harding Icefield can be seen from the summit, as well as Mount Alice on the opposite side of Resurrection Bay. This unofficially named peak takes its name from Franklin G. Lowell and his family who were the first homesteaders to settle the Seward area in 1883.

Climate

Based on the Köppen climate classification, Lowell Peak is located in a subarctic climate zone with long, cold, snowy winters, and mild summers. Temperatures can drop below −20 °C with wind chill factors below −30 °C. This climate supports an unnamed glacier on the west slope of the peak. Precipitation runoff from the north slope of the mountain drains into Lowell Creek, and the south side drains into Spruce Creek, and both creeks empty into Resurrection Bay.

See also

List of mountain peaks of Alaska
Geology of Alaska

References

External links
  National Weather Service forecast

Mountains of Alaska
Mountains of Kenai Peninsula Borough, Alaska
Kenai Mountains-Turnagain Arm National Heritage Area
North American 1000 m summits